St Laurence's Church, Bradford-on-Avon, Wiltshire, is one of very few surviving Anglo-Saxon churches in England that does not show later medieval alteration or rebuilding.

The church is dedicated to St Laurence and documentary sources suggest it may have been founded by Saint Aldhelm around 700, although the architectural style suggests a 10th- or 11th-century date.  St. Laurence's stands on rising ground close to the larger Norman parish church of the Holy Trinity.

The building was used as a combined school (nave) and cottage (chancel) for many years, both on more than one storey. It was rediscovered in 1856 by William Jones, rector of Holy Trinity, and restored between 1870 and 1880.  In 1952 the church was designated as Grade I listed.

The date of the building has been much debated.  H. M. Taylor stated some 50 years ago that he believed the main fabric of the walls to their full height belongs to Aldhelm's time, after discussions with Dr Edward Gilbert.  Most recent sources give a later date for all or most of the structure. It has been suggested it was built after 1001, when King Æthelred the Unready gave the site to the nuns of Shaftesbury Abbey, refugees from the Vikings.  They were the custodians of the body of King Edward the Martyr, Æthelred's half-brother and already regarded as a saint, and it may have served as a mortuary chapel for him for a period, which might help explain why such a small but elaborate building was created.

It is the most complete Anglo-Saxon survival from this period, and follows what seems to have been a typical monastic plan at the time, though in miniature. In particular the decoration including fragments of large reliefs gives a hint of richness which documentary remains record in monastic churches. Although the existing church seems all or almost all Anglo-Saxon, it has clearly been altered in a number of ways, apart from the modern restoration, which included removing the stairs inside and filling in windows. A porticus to the south has been lost, but otherwise the structure of the building seems complete in its final Anglo-Saxon state.

The pair of angels flying horizontally, in relief at about half life-size, probably flanked a large sculptural group of the Crucifixion, perhaps over the chancel arch.

The arcading on the exterior walls is produced, not by incision (as thought by Jackson and Fletcher), but by setting the massive stone pilaster-strips forward from the wall-face. In this they are similar to Great Dunham and the tower of Tasburgh parish church in Norfolk, and also to the parish churches at Earls Barton and Barton-upon-Humber.

References

Sources
Backhouse, Janet, Turner, D.H., and Webster, Leslie, eds.; The Golden Age of Anglo-Saxon Art, 966–1066, pp. 130, 139–141, 1984, British Museum Publications Ltd, 

PDF account from "Anglo-Saxon Churches"
Great English Churches
 

Standing Anglo-Saxon churches
8th-century church buildings in England
Church of England church buildings in Wiltshire
Grade I listed churches in Wiltshire
Saint Laurence's Church